The 2015 Atlantic hurricane season was an event in the annual hurricane season in the north Atlantic Ocean. It was the third consecutive year to feature below-average tropical cyclone activity, with eleven named storms. The season officially began on June 1, 2015 and ended on November 30, 2015. These dates, adopted by convention, historically describe the period in each year when most tropical systems form. However, systems can and do form outside these dates, as did the season's first storm, Tropical Storm Ana, which developed on May 8; the season's final storm, Hurricane Kate, lost its tropical characteristics on November 11.

The year featured twelve tropical cyclones, of which eleven became tropical storms, including four hurricanes of which two intensified into major hurricanes. While no hurricanes made landfall on the United States mainland during the year, two tropical storms, Ana and Bill, struck the coastline of South Carolina and Texas respectively. Ana was earliest landfalling tropical storm on record in the United States and caused two fatalities, while Bill produced heavy rain and flooding and caused eight fatalities. Additionally, the precursor to Bill also caused significant flooding across Central America. In late August, Tropical Storm Erika brought heavy rainfall to several Leeward Islands, especially to Dominica. It caused widespread damage and 31 fatalities. In October, Hurricane Joaquin, a Category 4 hurricane, battered The Bahamas for two days, causing extensive devastation to that nation while also contributing to historic flooding across the Southeastern United States. Additionally, Joaquin was responsible sinking of the American cargo ship El Faro and for the deaths of its 33–member crew. Following the 2015 season, the names Erika and Joaquin were retired from reuse in the North Atlantic by the World Meteorological Organization.

This timeline documents tropical cyclone formations, strengthening, weakening, landfalls, extratropical transitions, and dissipations during the season. It includes information that was not released throughout the season, meaning that data from post-storm reviews by the National Hurricane Center, such as a storm that was not initially warned upon, has been included.

By convention, meteorologists use one time zone when issuing forecasts and making observations: Coordinated Universal Time (UTC), and also use the 24-hour clock (where 00:00 = midnight UTC). The National Hurricane Center uses both UTC and the time zone where the center of the tropical cyclone is currently located. The time zones utilized (east to west) prior to 2020 were: Atlantic, Eastern, and Central. In this timeline, all information is listed by UTC first with the respective regional time included in parentheses. Additionally, figures for maximum sustained winds and position estimates are rounded to the nearest 5 units (knots, miles, or kilometers), following the convention used in the National Hurricane Center's products. Direct wind observations are rounded to the nearest whole number. Atmospheric pressures are listed to the nearest millibar and nearest hundredth of an inch of mercury.

Timeline

May

May 8
 00:00 UTC (8:00 p.m.

May 9
 00:00 UTC (8:00 p.m.
 06:00 UTC (2:00 a.m.

May 10
 10:00 UTC (6:00 a.m.
 18:00 UTC (2:00 p.m.

May 12
 00:00 UTC (8:00 p.m. EDT, May 11) at Tropical Depression Ana degenerates into a remnant low as it moves off of the Delmarva Peninsula, and subsequently merges with a frontal system.

June

June 1
 The 2015 Atlantic hurricane season officially begins.

June 16
 00:00 UTC (7:00 p.m.
 12:00 UTC (7:00 a.m.
 16:45 UTC (11:45 a.m.

June 17
 06:00 UTC (1:00 a.m.

June 18
 18:00 UTC (1:00 p.m.

July

July 13
 06:00 UTC (2:00 a.m.
 12:00 UTC (8:00 a.m.
 18:00 UTC (2:00 p.m.

July 15
 00:00 UTC (8:00 p.m.

August

August 18
 06:00 UTC (2:00 a.m.
 12:00 UTC (8:00 a.m.

August 20
 12:00 UTC (8:00 a.m.

August 21
 00:00 UTC (8:00 p.m.
 12:00 UTC (8:00 a.m.

August 22
 00:00 UTC (8:00 p.m.
 12:00 UTC (8:00 a.m.

August 23
00:00 UTC (8:00 p.m.

August 24
 12:00 UTC (8:00 a.m.
 18:00 UTC (2:00 p.m.

August 27
 06:00 UTC (2:00 a.m.

August 28
12:00 UTC (9:30 a.m.

August 30
 00:00 UTC (8:00 p.m.
 06:00 UTC (2:00 a.m.

August 31
 00:00 UTC (8:00 p.m.
 12:00 UTC (8:00 a.m.

September

September 1
 06:00 UTC (2:00 a.m.

September 4
 12:00 UTC (8:00 a.m.

September 5
 00:00 UTC (8:00 p.m.
 06:00 UTC (2:00 a.m.
 12:00 UTC (8:00 a.m.
 18:00 UTC (2:00 p.m.

September 6
 12:00 UTC (8:00 a.m.

September 8
 12:00 UTC (8:00 a.m.
 18:00 UTC (2:00 p.m.

September 9
 00:00 UTC (8:00 p.m.
 18:00 UTC (2:00 p.m.

September 11
 06:00 UTC (2:00 a.m.

September 16
 12:00 UTC (8:00 a.m.

September 17
06:00 UTC (2:00 a.m.

September 18
 06:00 UTC (2:00 a.m.

September 19
 00:00 UTC (8:00 p.m.
 12:00 UTC (8 a.m.

September 21
12:00 UTC (8:00 a.m.

September 24
06:00 UTC (2:00 a.m.

September 27
 12:00 UTC (8:00 a.m.

September 28
00:00 UTC (8:00 p.m.

September 29
00:00 UTC (8:00 p.m.

September 30
06:00 UTC (2:00 a.m.

October

October 1
 00:00 UTC (8:00 p.m.
 12:00 UTC (8:00 a.m.

October 2
 00:00 UTC (8:00 p.m.
 16:00 UTC (12:00 p.m.
 21:00 UTC (5:00 p.m.

October 3
 00:00 UTC (8:00 p.m.
12:00 UTC (8:00 a.m.

October 4
06:00 UTC (2:00 a.m.
12:00 UTC (8:00 a.m.

October 5
00:00 UTC (8:00 p.m.

October 7
 12:00 UTC (8:00 a.m.

October 8
 00:00 UTC (8:00 p.m.

November

November 8
 18:00 UTC (1:00 p.m.

November 9
06:00 UTC (1:00 a.m. EST) at Tropical Depression Twelve intensifies into Tropical Storm Kate near the central Bahamas, about 80 mi (130 km) southeast of San Salvador Island, Bahamas.

November 11
 00:00 UTC (8:00 p.m.
12:00 UTC (8:00 a.m.

November 12
00:00 UTC (8:00 p.m.

November 30
The 2015 Atlantic hurricane season officially ends.

See also

Lists of Atlantic hurricanes
Timeline of the 2015 Pacific hurricane season
Timeline of the 2015 Pacific typhoon season

Notes

References

External links

 2015 Tropical Cyclone Advisory Archive, National Hurricane Center and Central Pacific Hurricane Center
 Hurricanes and Tropical Storms – Annual 2015, National Centers for Environmental Information

2015 Atlantic hurricane season
2015
Articles which contain graphical timelines
2015 Atl T